The Grace Road Church (Korean: 은혜로교회) is a South Korean quasi-Christian new religious movement and cult (although its members call it a church) founded in 2002.

Church
Those who study the church claim it shares many similarities with other Korean cults. There is a belief of absolute obedience to the religious leader, a group-specific interpretation of the Bible and a teaching of the imminent coming of Jesus Christ, with a provision of the place for the final shelter.

Fiji
The church is currently based in Fiji, after its leader, Pastor Shin Ok-ju, predicted a famine in Korea. The group and its leader believe that Fiji is the so-called "center of the world as promised in the Bible" and moved there in 2014. Per the group's website, a missionary for the church was sent around the world to discover a land to survive the famine, and after scouting 60 countries settled on Fiji. After the members arrived in Fiji, all of the 400 followers' passports were reportedly seized by church leaders.

Mainstream churches in Fiji have reportedly raised accusations against the church for being a cult for years. A spokesman for the local Methodist Church told reporters, "I think it's common knowledge here that the movement is a cult movement...".

Corporate
The church raises funds for the church using the Grace Road Group, which opened various businesses across Fiji ranging from construction to agriculture stores. The company employed at least 300 Koreans and 100 Fijians in August 2018. The businesses opened by the group include restaurant chains, beauty salons, a construction firm, a hardware store, and a farm in partnership with the Fiji National University.

A statement from the organization claims that the allegations against Shin were false and "have gone too far." The statement continued with, "GR Group family, who have been working proudly as owners are very enraged by all the lies...Those who wish to slander us have created unspeakable lies about passport confiscation, forced labour, incarceration and violence."

Investigations, allegations of abuse and arrests
Footage has emerged of the Church's followers forcibly slapping each other, supposedly to beat the Devil out of each other. In a documentary aired in South Korea, testimony of ex-church members detailed allegations of physical abuse and overwork. Pastor Shin Ok-ju and other members would surround individuals and beat them.

In 2014, Shin was sued for $6 million by a man with schizophrenia, who alleged that she oversaw an attempt to cure him of his mental illness with prayer. The lawsuit alleged that she supervised the religious cleansing of the defendant by binding him with duct tape, and depriving him of his medication for 10 days, ultimately causing him to lose his leg due to gangrene. 

Three of its members were arrested after arriving at Incheon Airport in Seoul in July 2018. In August 2018, investigations into the group, after the arrest of the group's founder, included allegations of incarceration, assault, and the exploitation of foreign currency, were continued by Korean Police. The church headquarters in Navua were raided on 14 August by Korean police, the Department of Immigration, and Fijian police. After the raid followers of the church were offered consular assistance.

On 30 July 2019, it was announced that Shin was found guilty and sentenced to six years' imprisonment.  Following the announcement, cult members were angry and shouted requests for the victim's 'false' statements to be thrown out.

External Links
 Official website

References

2002 establishments in South Korea
Cults
Christian new religious movements
Religion in South Korea
Religion in Fiji
Christian organizations established in 2002
Apocalyptic groups